The Rose of Mooncoin is a ballad written in the 19th century by local schoolteacher and poet Watt Murphy,who was catholic , who met and gradually fell in love with a local Protestant girl called Elizabeth, also known as Molly, and set in Mooncoin, Ireland. Elizabeth was just 20 years old, and Watt was then 56, but the difference in age was of no consequence to either of them. Both were intellectuals, and they would often stroll along the banks of the River Suir, composing and reciting poetry. However, Elizabeth's father, who was the local vicar, did not approve of their relationship, and she was sent away to England. Watt was brokenhearted at the loss of his beloved lady, and wrote this song in her memory.

It has been recorded by, amongst others, Marika, Anna McGoldrick, Daniel O'Donnell, Paddy Reilly, Patsy Watchorn, Phil Coulter, Johnny McEvoy and The Wolfe Tones. However many music lovers have heralded the finest version to be that of Mooncoin's own Darren Holden.

Lyrics

References

Ballads
Irish folk songs
19th-century songs
Year of song unknown